Gonpo  Namgyal  (1799–1865) (sometimes, Gönpo Namgyel ), also known as Bulungwa (literally 'Blind Man'), was a Tibetan rebel leader from the Nyarong who unified the region, then all of Kham in a series of campaigns from the 1840s to the 1860s, warring against the Qing Dynasty and the Ganden Phodrang. While he was initially successful in evading his powerful enemies, he was eventually captured and killed, putting an end to his state of Nyarong.

Background

Gonpo Namgyal was born in Nyarong; his parents descended from a lineage of local chieftains who ruled the middle of that valley. His father had refused to submit to Qing rule and had been killed for it. The region of Nyarong was poor due to its isolation and inaccessibility, and its inhabitants made their living by raiding caravans and bandit activity. Soon Namgye inherited the chieftainship from his parents, marking his entry into the historical record.

Rise to power
By the end of the 1840s, Namgye had united the three chiefdoms of the Nyarong Valley, marking a break from its historical disunity. This was met with a Qing campaign into Nyarong, however, it was driven back. However, it soon became apparent that his ambitions were greater than this, as he soon attacked the Hor States, Derge, and Litang, as well as, in the words of Tibetan historian Yudru Tsomu, "harassing and plundering the domains of the Chakla king". To avoid Namgye's campaigns, due to his reputation for being merciless, states such as Golog, Nangchen, Serta, and Jyekundo decided to submit to his rule. By the early 1860s, he was confident enough to impede trade linking Kham and Tibet. However, what alarmed both the Ganden Phodrang and Qing China the most was his threat to enter Lhasa's Jokhang accompanied by his forces. There, he would steal two of the holiest statues of Tibetan Buddhism and install them at Nyarong, forcing pilgrims to travel there. By 1860, he controlled almost all of Kham.

Defeat and capture

In 1862, he took control of the Sichuan-Tibet Avenue, cut off the postal route, and blocked the delivery of food and salaries for the troops stationed in Tibet. For the Tibetan Kashag government, his control of the Kham area seriously affected the Sichuan-Tibet tea trade, and he took an anti-Buddhist stance and threatened the Kashag government, which was eager to exterminate him.

After the Qing Dynasty defeated the Taiping Heavenly Kingdom and the peasant uprising in Sichuan, in 1863, the Minister in Tibet was ordered to form a tie-up with the Governor-General of Sichuan to mobilize troops to suppress Bori and Gongbulang. In 1865, the Tibetan army first launched an attack on the Bori-Gongblang knot on the Jinsha River, and other Qing troops from all walks of life arrived one after another, and the Bori-Gongblang knot was besieged. In July, the Tibetan army surrounded Bori Village. Bori Gongbong led his troops to resist and ran out of ammunition and food, so he set fire to Bori Village and died in the fire.

Legacy and views

After the death of Namgye, the Ganden Phodrang government took control of Nyarong, as well as influencing Derge and the Hor States. This resulted in renewed conflict between Ganden Phodrang and Qing leaders, eventually culminating in Zhao Erfeng's expedition into Tibet. As Namgye's opposition to the Gandren Phodrang forms a parallel to the Chinese Communist Party's opposition towards the 14th Dalai Lama, the Communist government has praised Namgye as a peasant leader and hero; hotels have been erected bearing his name. The party's praise of him is in spite of his noble origins; this is justified with the slogan "where there is oppression, there is resistance". Some historians contend that if Namgye's state had survived, it would have been more effective than the Ganden Phodrang at dispelling Chinese invasion.

References

History of Tibet
People from Xinlong County
Tibetan Buddhists from Tibet
1799 births
1865 deaths
19th-century Tibetan people
18th-century Tibetan people